Yolanda Bonnell is a Canadian actress and playwright. She is most noted for her play Bug, which was a Governor General's Award nominee for English-language drama at the 2020 Governor General's Awards.

Early life and education 
An Anishinaabe member of the Fort William First Nation near Thunder Bay, Ontario and a graduate of Humber College's theatre school, she had her first significant acting role in a 2016 production of Judith Thompson's play The Crackwalker.

Career 
Her subsequent roles included a 2018 production of Kim Senklip Harvey's Kamloopa: An Indigenous Matriarch Story, and a 2019 production of Marie Clements's The Unnatural and Accidental Women.

Her play bug was staged at various theatre festivals, including the annual Rhubarb Festival at Buddies in Bad Times, beginning in 2015, and was a Dora Mavor Moore Award nominee for Outstanding New Play in 2019. It received its most widespread attention in early 2020, when a production by Theatre Passe Muraille saw Bonnell make a public request that the play be reviewed only by BIPOC theatre critics. Bonnell explained her request by noting that she had previously received racist reviews for her work, including from a critic who asserted that it was fit only to be seen on Indian reserves, and stated that "In Toronto, critics are mostly white and male. They come at Indigenous art with a different lens – that often comes back to 'If I don't understand it, that means it's not good or it's not a valid form of theatre'. I don't mind being critiqued. But at least let it come from a place of knowledge, of understanding what you're talking about."

Personal life 
Bonnell identifies as queer and two-spirit.

References

External links

21st-century Canadian actresses
21st-century Canadian dramatists and playwrights
21st-century Canadian women writers
21st-century First Nations writers
Canadian stage actresses
Canadian women dramatists and playwrights
First Nations dramatists and playwrights
First Nations actresses
First Nations women writers
Canadian LGBT dramatists and playwrights
LGBT actresses
Canadian LGBT actors
Queer dramatists and playwrights
Ojibwe people
Two-spirit people
Writers from Ontario
Humber College alumni
Living people
Year of birth missing (living people)
21st-century Canadian LGBT people